The Frontbench of H. V. Evatt was the opposition Australian Labor Party frontbench of Australia from 20 June 1951 to 9 February 1960, opposing the Liberal-Country Coalition government led by Robert Menzies.

H. V. Evatt became Leader of the Opposition upon his election as leader of the Australian Labor Party on 20 June 1951, and headed up the Australian Labor Party Caucus Executive until 1960.

Caucus Executive (1951-1954)
The following were members of the ALP Caucus Executive from 20 June 1951 to 3 August 1954:
 Rt Hon. H. V. Evatt   - Leader of the Opposition and Leader of the Labor Party
 Hon. Arthur Calwell  - Deputy Leader of the Opposition and Deputy Leader of the Labor Party
 Senator Hon. Nick McKenna - Leader of the Opposition in the Senate
 Senator Hon. John Armstrong - Deputy Leader of the Opposition in the Senate
 Senator James Arnold
 Tom Burke 
 Clyde Cameron  (from 1953)
 Hon. Cyril Chambers 
 Hon. Percy Clarey 
 Senator Hon. Ben Courtice
 Allan Fraser 
 Les Haylen 
 Hon. Reg Pollard 
 Sol Rosevear  (to 21 March 1953)
 Hon. Eddie Ward

Caucus Executive (1954-1956)
The following were members of the ALP Caucus Executive from 3 August 1954 to 13 February 1956:
 Rt Hon. H. V. Evatt   - Leader of the Opposition and Leader of the Labor Party
 Hon. Arthur Calwell  - Deputy Leader of the Opposition and Deputy Leader of the Labor Party
 Senator Hon. Nick McKenna - Leader of the Opposition in the Senate
 Senator Hon. John Armstrong - Deputy Leader of the Opposition in the Senate
 Senator Stan Amour
 Senator James Arnold
 Hon. Cyril Chambers 
 Hon. Percy Clarey 
 Allan Fraser 
 Jim Harrison 
 Les Haylen 
 Hon. Reg Pollard 
 Senator Dorothy Tangney
 Hon. Eddie Ward

Caucus Executive (1956-1959)
The following were members of the ALP Caucus Executive from 13 February 1956 to 16 February 1959:
 Rt Hon. H. V. Evatt   - Leader of the Opposition and Leader of the Labor Party
 Hon. Arthur Calwell  - Deputy Leader of the Opposition and Deputy Leader of the Labor Party
 Senator Hon. Nick McKenna - Leader of the Opposition in the Senate
 Senator Hon. Pat Kennelly - Deputy Leader of the Opposition in the Senate
 Clyde Cameron 
 Hon. Cyril Chambers 
 Hon. Percy Clarey 
 Senator Hon. Ben Courtice
 Frank Crean 
 Bill Edmonds 
 Allan Fraser 
 Les Haylen 
 Hon. Reg Pollard 
 Senator Dorothy Tangney
 Hon. Eddie Ward

Caucus Executive (1959-1960)
The following were members of the ALP Caucus Executive from 16 February 1959 to 9 February 1960:
 Rt Hon. H. V. Evatt   - Leader of the Opposition and Leader of the Labor Party
 Hon. Arthur Calwell  - Deputy Leader of the Opposition and Deputy Leader of the Labor Party
 Senator Hon. Nick McKenna - Leader of the Opposition in the Senate
 Senator Hon. Pat Kennelly - Deputy Leader of the Opposition in the Senate
 Lance Barnard 
 Clyde Cameron 
 Hon. Percy Clarey 
 Senator Hon. Ben Courtice
 Frank Crean 
 Allan Fraser 
 Les Haylen 
 Hon. Reg Pollard 
 Hon. Eddie Ward 
 Gough Whitlam

See also
 Frontbench of Ben Chifley
 Frontbench of Arthur Calwell
 Menzies government (1949–1966)
 Fifth ministry
 Sixth ministry
 Seventh ministry
 Eighth ministry

References

Australian Labor Party
Evatt
Opposition of Australia